Hassan Turki Attiya (born July 1, 1981 in Iraq) is an Iraqi football midfielder formerly playing for the Sulaymaniyah FC football club in Iraq.

Hassan Turki was captain of the youth team that won the 2000 Asian Youth Championship in Tehran.

He was also one of 10 youth players brought into the 2002 World Cup qualifying squad by Milan Zivadinovic, making his debut as a half-time substitute in the 0–0 draw against Lebanon on January 31, 2001. After Milan was sacked and Adnan Hamad was appointed coach, he was one of only three youth players left in the squad.

References

External links
 Hassan Turki on Iraqsport
 

1981 births
Living people
Iraqi footballers
al-Karkh SC players
Duhok SC players
Al-Hussein SC (Irbid) players
Al-Talaba SC players
Al-Zawraa SC players
Amanat Baghdad players
al Hala SC players
Al-Ahli Club (Manama) players
2004 AFC Asian Cup players
Iraqi expatriate footballers
Expatriate footballers in Bahrain
Expatriate footballers in Jordan
Iraq international footballers
Association football midfielders